System D-128 also known as Duey FM, born name Brian Torres Korlofsky is a music video and film director, editor, video artist, new media artist and producer.

Early life
Brian Korlofsky was born in New York City to parents of Puerto Rican and Russian descent. He was later raised in St. Croix, U.S. Virgin Islands and Florida.

He first got into audio and video when VCRs were first introduced. His father obtained one and his family began recording television programs on a regular basis, a habit he later continued. He archived material and used it for audio and video mixes and as source material for sample-based productions, installations, and visual backdrops for touring artists.

Career
System D-128 has done visuals for artists such as A-Trak, Mr. Scruff, RJD2, Atmosphere, Murs, Dead Prez, Immortal Technique, Mr. Lif, Jeru the Damaja, Bahamadia, Rahzel, El-P, Kool Keith, A Tribe Called Quest, Wu-Tang Clan, Method Man and Redman, The Diplomats, Justice, Mike Patton, M.I.A., Rye Rye, Blaqstarr, Switch, TTC, Lusine, Eliot Lipp, Glass Candy, Buraka Som Sistema, CSS, Boys Noize, Bonde Do Role, Amanda Blank, Spank Rock, Girl Talk, VHS or BETA, and Daft Punk.

Work with MF DOOM
System D-128 as a DJ & Producer made 3 tracks for Viktor Vaughn VV:2, also known as Venomous Villain The record label 
Big Dada, which has released singles & many full length recordings on their roster, including King Geedorah, Bigg Jus, Roots Manuva, Spank Rock and Diplo, put together a 10-year retrospective DVD entitled "Well Deep."  It contains original music videos that System D-128 has produced, directed and edited in their entirety. Including a music video for MF DOOM / King Geedorah "The Final Hour" from the album Take Me To Your Leader Another notable project includes making a music video for Madvillain's "Shadows of Tomorrow" off of the album Madvillainy. This track featured Quasimoto and Sun Ra. The music video was included on the Stones Throw 101 DVD and CD as an easter egg in the extra credit section. (To access the content, scroll to the bottom of the videos on the chalkboard; then scroll right to the blue eraser and push play).

Work with Bigg Jus
System D created a political "associated media" piece for Bigg Jus, the former member of Company Flow. It was entitled "Silver Back Mountain King" and released on September 11, 2004 on D-128’s production company website.

Work with Diplo
In 2004 he created a DVD to come with the first official Diplo record "Florida" off Big Dada / Ninja Tune Records. The album was pressed twice, first with a CD and the second with a CD & DVD. Before the Diplo Florida DVD there was another DVD that surfaced called Diplo "Banned in Libya" which was released by Money Studies, the first label to release a solo project by Diplo under his original DJ name Diplodocus. It was a 45 rpm record called "Thingamajawn" which there is also a music video for, that System D-128 directed as well, similar to the Florida DVD "Banned in Libya" is an experimental audio & video mix of some of Diplo's music and other sources that are unknown. System D-128 also collaborated on a song with Diplo called "Blue Beards Dreams" which was later used by MF DOOM on the Viktor Vaughn release "Venomous Villain". The newer version of the track was then titled "Back End". System D-128 also produced the intro and an interlude for that particular record.

System D-128 helped Diplo with the introduction of Mad Decent, the name and first conception of the company and logo was first seen on the Florida release, along with Hollertronix and Pinniped Science. D-128 also worked on initial aboriginal Heaps Decent promotional projects with OBEY, Ed Banger Records, Apple, Ableton Live and Scratch Live in New Zealand and Australia.

In 2008 System D-128 had a full page article in the December URB Magazine Issue #156. It covered numerous projects he was creatively involved in as, as well as upcoming video projects.

Discography and videography 
12-Inch 3-D Single
(2007) Acid Girlzzz Bonus Beat 
 
Audio projects
 Deathstar 1 
 Brian Confusion 
 Blue Beards Dreams feat. Diplodocus 
 Back End feat. Diplo & Viktor Vaughn / MF DOOM 
 Viktormizor 
 Strange New Day 
 Mad Decent Worldwide Radio #9 (Kill Yourself) 
 Mad Decent Worldwide Radio #20 (Kill Yourself Again) 
 Mad Decent Worldwide Radio #38 (Kill Yourself 3-D) 

AV projects
 Subterranean Videodrome DVD 
 Diplo "Banned In Libya" DVD 
 Diplo "Florida" DVD 
 Safety 1st DVD "H is for Hollertronix"
 White Label TV DVD  Well Deep DVD "Video Megamix"  On that Blue **** DVD Mad Decent Video Podcast SeriesMusic videos
 Diplodocus - Thingamajawn Diplo - Indian Thick Jawn Bigg Jus - Silver Back Mountain King Bigg Jus - Illustrations of Hieronymus Bosch Percee P - Put It On The Line Madvillain - Shadows of Tomorrow King Geedorah - The Final Hour Jon Kennedy - Demons Ron Rico & The Letter People - Miss A Adrian Michna - Triple Chrome Dipped''

References

External links 
Official Vimeo Page
System D-128 Press Kit

Living people
American music video directors
VJ (video performance artists)
Year of birth missing (living people)